Aterica rabena is a butterfly in the family Nymphalidae. It is found on Madagascar. The habitat consists of forests.

References

Butterflies described in 1833
Limenitidinae
Lepidoptera of Madagascar
Butterflies of Africa
Taxa named by Jean Baptiste Boisduval